A drug-related crime is a crime to possess, manufacture, or distribute drugs classified as having a potential for abuse (such as cocaine, heroin, morphine and amphetamines). Drugs are also related to crime as drug trafficking and drug production are often controlled by drug cartels, organised crime and gangs.

The statistics on this page summarise various ways that drugs and crime are related in the United States. Links for other countries are provided below. Some drug-related crime involves crime against the person such as robbery or sexual assaults.

U.S. Bureau of Justice Statistics 
In 2002, in the U.S. about a quarter of convicted property and drug offenders in local jails had committed their crimes to get money for drugs, compared to 5% of violent and public order offenders. Among State prisoners in 2004 the pattern was similar, with property (30%) and drug offenders (26%) more likely to commit their crimes for drug money than violent (10%) and public-order offenders (7%). In Federal prisons property offenders (11%) were less than half as likely as drug offenders (25%) to report drug money as a motive in their offenses.

In 2004, 17% of U.S. State prisoners and 18% of Federal inmates said they committed their current offense to obtain money for drugs. These percentages represent a slight increase for Federal prisoners (16% in 1997) and a slight decrease for State prisoners (19% in 1997).

Drugs and crime
Drug abuse and addiction is associated with drug-related crimes. In the U.S. several jurisdictions have reported that benzodiazepine misuse by criminal detainees has surpassed that of opiates. Patients reporting to two emergency rooms in Canada with violence-related injuries were most often found to be intoxicated with alcohol and were significantly more likely to test positive for benzodiazepines (most commonly temazepam) than other groups of individuals, whereas other drugs were found to be insignificant in relation to violent injuries.

Research carried out on drug-related crime found that drug misuse is associated with various crimes that are in part related to the feelings of invincibility, which can become particularly pronounced with abuse. Problematic crimes associated include shoplifting, property crime, drug dealing, violence and aggression and driving whilst intoxicated. In Scotland among the 71% of suspected criminals testing positive for controlled drugs at the time of their arrest benzodiazepines (over 85% are temazepam cases) are detected more frequently than opiates and are second only to cannabis, which is the most frequently detected drug.

Research carried out by the Australian government found that benzodiazepine users are more likely to be violent, more likely to have been in contact with the police, and more likely to have been charged with criminal behavior than those using opiates. Illicit benzodiazepines mostly originate from medical practitioners but leak onto the illicit scene due to diversion and doctor shopping. Although only a very small number originate from thefts, forged prescriptions, armed robberies, or ram raids, it is most often benzodiazepines, rather than opiates, that are targeted in part because benzodiazepines are not usually locked in vaults and or do not have as strict laws governing prescription and storage of many benzodiazepines. Temazepam accounts for most benzodiazepine sought by forgery of prescriptions and through pharmacy burglary in Australia.

Benzodiazepines have been used as a tool of murder by serial killers, and other murderers, such as those with the condition Munchausen Syndrome by Proxy. Benzodiazepines have also been used to facilitate rape or robbery crimes, and benzodiazepine dependence has been linked to shoplifting due to the fugue state induced by the chronic use of the drug. When benzodiazepines are used for criminal purposes against a victim they are often mixed with food or drink.

Temazepam and midazolam are the most common benzodiazepines used to facilitate date rape. Alprazolam has been abused for the purpose of carrying out acts of incest and for the corruption of adolescent girls. However, alcohol remains the most common drug involved in cases of drug rape. Although benzodiazepines and ethanol are the most frequent drugs used in sexual assaults, GHB is another potential date rape drug that has received increased media focus.

Some benzodiazepines are more associated with crime than others especially when abused or taken in combination with alcohol. The potent benzodiazepine flunitrazepam (Rohypnol), which has strong amnesia-producing effects can cause abusers to become ruthless and also cause feelings of being invincible. This has led to some acts of extreme violence to others, often leaving abusers with no recollection of what they have done in their drug-induced state. It has been proposed that criminal and violent acts brought on by benzodiazepine abuse may be related to lowered serotonin levels via enhanced GABAergic effects.

Flunitrazepam has been implicated as the cause of one serial killer's violent rampage, triggering off extreme aggression with anterograde amnesia. A study on forensic psychiatric patients who had abused flunitrazepam at the time of their crimes found that the patients displayed extreme violence, lacked the ability to think clearly, and experienced a loss of empathy for their victims while under the influence of flunitrazepam, and it was found that the abuse of alcohol or other drugs in combination with flunitrazepam compounded the problem. Their behaviour under the influence of flunitrazepam was in contrast to their normal psychological state.

Criticisms 
The concept of drug-related crime has been criticized for being too blunt, especially in its failure to distinguish between three types of crime associated with drugs:
 Use-Related crime: These are crimes that result from or involve individuals who ingest drugs, and who commit crimes as a result of the effect the drug has on their thought processes and behavior.
 Economic-Related crime: These are crimes where an individual commits a crime to fund a drug habit.  These include theft and prostitution.
 System-Related crime: These are crimes that result from the structure of the drug system.  They include production, manufacture, transportation, and sale of drugs, as well as violence related to the production or sale of drugs, such as a turf war.

Drug-related crime may be used as a justification for prohibition, but, in the case of system-related crime, the acts are only crimes because of prohibition.  In addition, some consider even user-related and economic-related aspects of crime as symptomatic of a broader problem.

See also
Alcohol-related crime
Drug abuse
Drugwipe test
Self-medication

General:
Prohibition (drugs)
Single Convention on Narcotic Drugs

Organized crime:
Cigarette smuggling
Drug Cartel
Drug Lord
Illegal drug trade
Organized crime
Rum-running

US specific:
Bureau of Justice Statistics
Bureau of Alcohol, Tobacco, Firearms and Explosives
Comprehensive Drug Abuse Prevention and Control Act of 1970
Controlled Substances Act
Drug Enforcement Administration
Food and Drug Administration
Racketeer Influenced and Corrupt Organizations Act (RICO)
U.S. Immigration and Customs Enforcement
Uniform Crime Report

References

External links

 Defining drug-related crime - EU
 Drug-related crime Canada
 Drug-related crime UK
 PDF version of Drug-related crime U.S. Department of Justice
 Prevention of drug-related crime - EU
 Beckley Foundation Report 2005, Reducing drug-related crime: an overview of the global Evidence
 Driving under the influence of drugs
 The National Center for Victims of Crime

Drug control law
Crime by type